Rudolf Kingslake (born Rudolf Klickmann; August 28, 1903 – February 28, 2003) was an English academic, lens designer, and engineer.

Kingslake was born in London, England in 1903 as Rudolf Klickmann. The latter is in all probability a  re-transcription from Cyrillic of the traditional German-Jewish "Glückmann" meaning "lucky man". Kingslake studied optical design at the Imperial College of Science and Technology, under the eminent optical designer and theoretician Alexander Eugen Conrady, earning a master's degree, subsequently marrying Professor Conrady's daughter, Hilda Conrady Kingslake, a prominent English-American researcher in the field of optics.

In 1929, Kingslake was invited to come to the United States to teach at the University of Rochester, where he founded the Institute of Applied Optics, now known as The Institute of Optics. In 1937, Kingslake became the head of Optical Design department of Eastman Kodak while continuing his teaching at the university.

In 1958, Kingslake and wife Hilda edited an unfinished manuscript by Conrady and published a sequel to Conrady's book, Applied Optics and Optical Design.

Since 1974, SPIE has awarded the Rudolf Kingslake Medal to recognize the most noteworthy original paper published in the society's journal, Optical Engineering.

Rudolf Kingslake died on February 28, 2003, in Rochester, NY, at age 99, two weeks after the death of his wife, Hilda.

Books by Kingslake 
 Applied Optics and Optical Engineering
 Lenses in Photography: The Practical Guide to Optics for Photographers 
 Optics in Photography
 Lens Design Fundamentals
 A History of the Photographic Lens
 Applied Optics and Optical Design, Part II by A.E. Conrady, edited by Hilda and Rudolf Kingslake

References

External links
The Rudolf Kingslake Medal and Prize of the SPIE
1973 - Frederic Ives Medal by the OSA
A comprehensive history of the first 75 years of the Institute of Optics

Optical engineers
Alumni of Imperial College London
University of Rochester faculty
Kodak people
Engineers from London
English emigrants to the United States
1903 births
2003 deaths
20th-century British engineers